The 2006–07 WWHL season  was the third season of the Western Women's Hockey League. The Calgary Oval X-Treme enjoyed an undefeated season and claimed the WWHL Champions cup.

Exhibition
Oct 23, 2006: Calgary Flames Alumni took on the Calgary Oval X-Treme at the Max Bell Centre in the Calgary Super Drug Mart Champions' Cup, winning by a  9-8 score in an over time shoot out. More than 1,000 fans were in attendance and helped raise $7,500 for the Goal On Sight charity and the Olympic Oval Female Hockey Program. Claude Vilgrain clinched the Flames Alumni victory in the shoot out, scoring the only goal against X-Treme goalie Ali Boe.

Final standings
Note: GP = Games played, W = Wins, L = Losses, T = Ties, GF = Goals for, GA = Goals against, Pts = Points.

Playoffs

Final round: Calgary Oval X-Treme vs. Minnesota Whitecaps
 Calgary Oval X-Treme win the WWHL Champions cup.

Scoring Leaders

Goalie Leaders

References

External links
   Western Women's Hockey League

Western Women's Hockey League seasons
WWHL